Woodcutts Settlement is an archaeological site of the late Iron Age and Romano-British period on Cranborne Chase, England. It is a scheduled monument.

Description
There was probably a single farmstead here. Within was a mound, two rectangular depressions and two circular hollows.

Excavations
There was limited excavation in 1863 by J. H. Austen, of features in the main enclosure.

Augustus Pitt Rivers, inheritor of the Rushmore Estate, where he was resident from 1880, investigated many prehistoric monuments on his estate. He excavated the site at Woodcutts in 1884 and 1885. The main enclosure, and two of the outer enclosures, were totally excavated. The site was afterwards partially reconstructed, the earth cleared from the ditch of the main enclosure being used to heighten the bank. He published his findings in 1887.

Pitt Rivers was aware that the site had changed during a long period of occupation. His results were interpreted about 50 years later by Christopher Hawkes, who established that there were three phases of development.

In the second phase, during the late 2nd century AD, the three outer enclosures were built, one on the west and two on the east of which one contained two corn-drying ovens. In the third phase, in the early 4th century AD, a new enclosure was constructed (seen before excavation began), partly over the sites of the earlier main and western enclosure. This enclosure contained a well and a building with painted wattle walls. The eastern enclosures were retained, one of them being enlarged. A new enclosure, containing a corn-drying oven, was constructed on the north side.

Finds from the excavation included pottery, metal objects (including pins, spoons, harness, knives and ploughshare-tips) and coins. Pottery and coins indicated occupation until about 360. Finds were later placed in the Dorset County Museum and the Wiltshire Museum.

Excavations by Pitt Rivers
Other sites on Cranborne Chase excavated by Pitt Rivers include the Martin Down Enclosure, Rotherley Down Settlement, South Lodge Camp and Wor Barrow.

References

Scheduled monuments in Dorset
Archaeological sites in Dorset
Iron Age sites in England